The Brawn Rocks are prominent isolated rocks extending over , lying  southwest of the Sequence Hills in Victoria Land, Antarctica. They were mapped by the United States Geological Survey from surveys and from U.S. Navy air photos, 1960–64, and named by the Advisory Committee on Antarctic Names for James E. Brawn, an aviation machinist's mate with U.S. Navy Squadron VX-6 at McMurdo Station, 1966. These large rock formations lie situated on the Pennell Coast, a portion of Antarctica lying between Cape Williams and Cape Adare.

References 

Rock formations of Victoria Land
Pennell Coast